Geogepa pedaliota is a moth of the family Tortricidae. It is found in Taiwan.

References

Moths described in 1936
Archipini